Hemiancistrus punctulatus is a species of catfish in the family Loricariidae. It is native to South America, where it occurs in the Lagoa dos Patos basin in Brazil. The species reaches 19 cm (7.5 inches) SL.

References 

Ancistrini
Fish described in 1999